Kila Saifullah District, Qilla Saifullah, or Saifullah Killa (Urdu and) is a district in northwestern Balochistan province, Pakistan. It was established as a district in  1988 comprising two former administrative units of Zhob District: the Upper Zhob sub-division and the sub-tehsil of Badinai, previously named Kashatoo and part of the subdistrict of Kakar Khurasan.

History
Early in the 13th century the country came within the sphere of the raids organised by Genghis Khan, the Mongol. In 1398 AD, an expedition against the Afghans of the area was led by Pir Muhammad, grandson of Amir Timur. Although no authentic information exist about any foreign occupation, many forts, mounds and karezes are attributed to the Mughals. Both Nadir Shah (reigned 1736–47) and Ahmed Shah (reigned 1747–73) extended their power through Balochistan and thenceforth Zhob remained under the more or less nominal suzerainty of the Durranis and Barakzais until it came under British protection. In the middle of the 18th century Ahmed Shah granted a sanad (certificate) to Bekar Nika, fourth in descent from Jogi and the head of the Jogezai family, conferring upon him the title and position of "Badshah or Ruler of Zhob". Shah Jehan Jogezai was conferred as Badshah of Zhob. The descendants of Shah Jehan Jogezai used to live in Loralai District of Balochistan.

The British sent its Zhob Expedition in 1884 in order to occupy the Zhob region through Baratkhail. Meanwhile, the castles of Saifullah Khan Khoidadzai and Shah Jehan Jogezai (Badshah of Zhob) were demolished. On 7 October 1884, an assault on the Qalla (castle) of Shah Jehan near Akhterzai resulted the killings of many tribal people including Malik Hamza Daulatzai and Mohammad Ghous who fought bravely. All 500 tribal Sardars admitted their submission before the British forces and also signed an agreement that they will not interfere in the affairs of British Government in Zhob region except Saifullah Khan Khoidadzai and Shah Jehan Jogezai who had a narrow escape from the battle scene and established themselves at Kalat; where they used to operate their insurgency campaign against the British and never subdued before the British occupying forces.

Demographics
At the time of the 2017 census the district had a population of 342,932, of which 63,293 (18.46%) lived in urban areas. Qilla Saifullah had a sex ratio of 886 females per 1000 males and a literacy rate of 32.77% - 43.22% for males and 21.00% for females. 135,817 (39.60%) were under 10 years of age. 432 people in the district were from religious minorities. Pashto was the predominant language, spoken by 97.84% of the population.

Administration
The district is administratively subdivided into the following tehsils:
 Killa Saifullah
 Muslim Bagh

At present the district is divided into two sub-divisions: Qilla Saifullah and Muslim Bagh. Kila Saifullah sub-division comprises one tehsil (Killa Saifullah) and one sub-tehsil (Badinai). Killa Saifullah tehsil is further sub-divided into two Qanungo circles and then into five patwar circles. The entire Badinai sub-tehsil is a Qanungo circle as well as patwar circle. Muslim Bagh sub-division comprises Muslim Bagh tehsil and Loiband sub-tehsil. The entire Muslim Bagh tehsil is one Qanungo circle, further sub-divided into four patwar circles. The Loiband sub-tehsil consists of one qanungo circle and is sub-divided into two patwar circles.

Populated places
Babu China
Muslim Bagh
Qilla Saifullah

Education 
According to the Pakistan District Education Rankings 2017, district Killa Saifullah is ranked at number 127 out of the 141 ranked districts in Pakistan on the education score index. This index considers learning, gender parity and retention in the district.

Literacy rate in 2014–15 of population 10 years and older in the district stands at 40% whereas for females it is only 6%.

Post primary access is a major issue in the district with 88% schools being at primary level. Compare this with high schools which constitute only 4% of government schools in the district. This is also reflected in the enrolment figures for 2016–17 with 15,836 students enrolled in class 1 to 5 and only 338 students enrolled in class 9 and 10.

Gender disparity is another issue in the district. Only 24% schools in the district are girls’ schools. Access to education for girls is a major issue in the district and is also reflected in the low literacy rates for females.

Moreover, the schools in the district lack basic facilities. According to Alif Ailaan district education rankings 2017, the district is ranked at number 140 out of the 155 districts of Pakistan for primary school infrastructure. At the middle school level, it is ranked at number 134 out of the 155 districts. These rankings take into account the basic facilities available in schools including drinking water, working toilet, availability of electricity, existence of a boundary wall and general building condition. Approximately 3 out of 4 schools do not have electricity in them. 2 out 3 schools lack a toilet and 1 out of 2 schools do not have a boundary wall. 2 out of 5 schools do not have clean drinking water.

The main issue for the district is the poor infrastructure of schools. They are reported to be in poor condition and need immediate repair.

Oil and minerals
The district is rich with mineral wealth and produces high quality chromite in Pakistan, the second largest reserve in the world. Gypsum, ores of coal, salt, granite, marble, copper and gabbro are also found in various parts of the district. Being rich in oil and gas, the government of Pakistan has started oil and gas exploration in the Murgha Fairzai, Shaighala and Kakar Khurasan areas.

Location
Killa Saifullah is about 182 km south of the provincial capital Quetta. Neighbouring districts are Zhob, Loralai and Pishin.

Notable people
Nawab Ayaz Jogezai
Usman Khan Kakar
Arman Loni
Wranga Loni
Arfa Siddiq
Maulana Abdul Wasay

References

Bibliography

External links

 Killa Saifullah District at www.balochistan.gov.pk
 Killa Saifullah District at www.balochistanpolice.gov.pk

 
Districts of Pakistan
Districts of Balochistan, Pakistan